Forget is the debut studio album by American musician Twin Shadow. It was produced in Brooklyn, New York by Chris Taylor of Grizzly Bear.

As of 2011, it has sold 10,985 copies in the United States, according to Nielsen SoundScan.

Critical reception

Pitchfork placed the record at number 26 on its Top 50 Albums of 2010 list.

Track listing
All songs written by Twin Shadow.

The CD tracklist slightly differs from the one above.

Personnel
 Twin Shadow – writer, producer, musician, photography
 Chris Taylor – producer, mixer
 Prince Language – producer, additional (on "Shooting Holes" and "Forget")
 Emily Lazar – mastering
 Joe LaPorta – mastering
 Samantha West – cover photography

References 

2010 debut albums
Albums produced by Chris Taylor (Grizzly Bear musician)
Twin Shadow albums